Robert Horn is a playwright, screenwriter and producer. He is best known on the stage for his Tony Award-winning book for the Broadway musical adaptation of Tootsie, as well as 13, Disney Theatrical's Hercules, and the upcoming Broadway musical Shucked. For film and television, he is best known as the screenwriter for Netflix's 13: the Musical and the Disney Channel Original Movies Teen Beach Movie, Teen Beach 2, Sharpay's Fabulous Adventure, and The Suite Life Movie.

Life and career 
Horn, a New York native, studied theater at New York University Tisch School of the Arts and New York's Circle in the Square Theatre School.

Soon after, Horn moved to Los Angeles to pursue a writing career in film and television. His first major job was as a writer/producer on the television series Designing Women, followed by Fox series Living Single and CBS comedy High Society.

After moving to Los Angeles, Horn was signed to an overall production deal with Warner Brothers Studios, where he developed, wrote, and executive produced dozens of network pilots and series. He then signed a script deal at Sony Studios, followed by an overall pilot deal at ABC studios. Along with Bob Boyett, Horn created and wrote the FX series Partners.

Horn wrote pilots for Car Wash (developed with Will Packer), Jenni starring Jenni Rivera, Sunnyland starring Jennifer Hudson, Left of Center (developed with Gail Berman), Taxi 22 starring James Gandolfini, and 13: the Musical on Netflix.

For Disney Channel, Horn wrote The Suite Life Movie as well as TV musicals Sharpay’s Fabulous Adventure and the record-breaking Teen Beach Movie and Teen Beach 2, the former pulling in the third highest viewership ever for the channel, on the heels of High School Musical 2 and Wizards of Waverly Place: The Movie. Horn also wrote Wild Life for Walt Disney Feature Animations and Good Advice featuring Charlie Sheen.

Special projects include The RuPaul Christmas Special on BBC, Bette Midler's Divine Intervention Tour, and a digital musical series co-written with Jason Robert Brown for Sony's digital Crackle network.

Horn's writing for the theater stage includes Dame Edna, Back with a Vengeance, 13, Disney's Hercules, The Broadway musical Shucked, and the musical version of Tootsie. Horn's work on Tootsie received widespread acclaim upon the musical's pre-Broadway premiere in Chicago – Vanity Fair says "the humor of Tootsie arises from writer Robert Horn’s bull’s-eye deployment of zingers – and the cast’s infallible delivery of them." The Chicago Tribune says that "Tootsie is a very funny show, mostly due to Horn’s book."

Awards

References

External links
Internet Broadway database

American male dramatists and playwrights
American television writers
Living people
Tony Award winners
Year of birth missing (living people)